Alisa Xayalith (born 24 August 1986) is a New Zealand musician, and is best known as the lead vocalist, guitarist and keyboard player for New Zealand indie electronic band The Naked and Famous.

Early life 
Xayalith was born in New Zealand, and is the daughter of Laotian refugees.  She has one older sister, one older brother, and two other brothers.  Shortly after Alisa's seventh birthday, her mother passed away from breast cancer. Having grown up in South Auckland, New Zealand, her father was a vocalist in a local Laotian ensemble.

The Naked and Famous 

In 2006, Xayalith met Thom Powers and Aaron Short at the Music and Audio Institute of New Zealand.  Shortly thereafter, Powers and Xayalith began dating.  It was from this encounter, that in 2007, pop band The Naked and Famous was formed.  In 2012, the quintet moved to Los Angeles, California, United States.  In 2014, Powers and Xayalith ended their romantic relationship, but both continued to remain as members in the band.

The Naked and Famous parted ways with Aaron Short and Jesse Wood in 2018, followed by their split with Luna Shadows and David Beadle some time prior to March 2020.  As of December 2021, the ensemble continues to perform as a duo with both Powers and Xayalith.

Solo career 
In December 2021, Xayalith published a song entitled "High Fidelity", the first tune from the musician's upcoming EP.  The track was produced by Tyler Spry and Simon Oscroft, with a music video directed by Jason Lester.

COVID-19 illness 
On 20 December 2021, the singer announced that she was diagnosed with COVID-19, and that she was in a romantic relationship.

Critical reception 
Alex Gallagher of NME Networks describes Xayalith's debut single "High Fidelity" as "a lush, spacious pop cut that foregrounds the singer’s syrupy vocals with shimmering synths and a soaring, effervescent chorus."

With regard to the debut hit, Dan Shaw of We Are Happy Media stated that "With shimmering retro synths and powerhouse vocals front and centre, it blooms with romantic colours" going on to say that the "accompanying video mirrors the lyrical reveries of Xayalith, making a star of the Californian landscape".

Discography

EPs 
 Superpowers (2022)

Singles 
 "High Fidelity" (2021)
 "I'll Be There" (2022)

As featured artist 
 "Psychadelic Girl" by Kidz in Space from Episode 001: Chasing Hayley (2009)
 "Tucan" by Kids of 88 from Modern Love (2012)
 "Forget" by The Chain Gang of 1974 from Felt (2017)
 "Move" by Peking Duk (2020)
 "Half Light" by Attlas from Lavender God (2020)

As writer 
 "Half Naked & Almost Famous" by Machine Gun Kelly from Rage Pack (2011) as well as Lace Up/Half Naked & Almost Famous (2012)
 "Little Deaths" by Sir Sly from The Rise & Fall of Loverboy (2021)

Other credits 
 Various background vocals, Human by OneRepublic (2021)

References 

1986 births
21st-century multi-instrumentalists
21st-century New Zealand women singers
21st-century pianists
21st-century women guitarists
Living people
New Zealand keyboardists
New Zealand people of Laotian descent
New Zealand rock guitarists
New Zealand women in electronic music
New Zealand women pop singers
Pop guitarists
Pop keyboardists
Rock keyboardists
Women keyboardists
21st-century women pianists